Lohagara is an upazila of Narail District in the Division of Khulna, Bangladesh. Lohagara Thana was established in 1861 and was converted into an upazila in 1984. It is named after its administrative center, the town of Lohagara.

Geography
Situated between the Nabaganga and Madhumati rivers, it borders Magura District to the north, Dhaka Division to the east, Kalia Upazila to the south, and Narail Sadar Upazila to the west.

Demographics

According to the 2011 Bangladesh census, Lohagara Upazila had 51,233 households and a population of 228,594, 11.1% of whom lived in urban areas. 10.9% of the population was under the age of 5. The literacy rate (age 7 and over) was 61.9%, compared to the national average of 51.8%.

Points of interest
Kalibari Mandir is a Hindu temple in Lakshmipasha dedicated to the goddess Kali. Writing in 1870, James Westland, former Magistrate and Collector of Jessore, gave an account of its origins:
A hundred years ago, and more, there lived here a pious blacksmith who used frequently to make images of Kali, and after worshipping them to cast them into the river, according to the ceremony of 'bissarjan.' But one night Kali appeared to him and told him that she had determined permanently to take up her abode with him; so he gave her a house. Not very long since a masonry temple was built for her.

Administration
Lohagara Upazila is divided into Lohagara Municipality and 12 union parishads: Dighalia, Itna, Joypur, Kashipur, Kotakul, Lahuria, Lakshmipasha, Lohagara, Mallikpur, Naldi, Noagram, and Shalnagar. The union parishads are subdivided into 154 mauzas and 217 villages.

Lohagara Municipality is subdivided into 9 wards and 24 mahallas.

Education

There are seven colleges in the upazila. They include Lakshmi Pasha Ideal Women's Degree College, Nabaganga Degree College,Itna College (1995) and S.M.A. Ahad College. Lohagara Adarsha College is the only honors level one.

The madrasa education system includes one fazil madrasa.

See also
 Upazilas of Bangladesh
 Districts of Bangladesh
 Divisions of Bangladesh

References

 
Upazilas of Narail District
1861 establishments in British India